Epacadostat (previously INCB24360) is an investigational drug for cancer.  Epacadostat is an inhibitor of indoleamine 2,3-dioxygenase-1 (IDO1). Epacadostat inhibits IDO1 by competitively blocking it, without interfering with IDO2 or tryptophan 2,3-dioxygenase (TDO). It has antitumor activity in some models, though is most effective when combined with other immunotherapy agents.

History and clinical trials
As of 2017, the combination of epacadostat with pembrolizumab (Keytruda) was being investigated by Incyte and Merck & Co. in several cancers, as was the combination of epacadostat with nivolumab (Opdivo) by Incyte and Bristol Myers Squibb.

In April 2018, Incyte announced they were halting the Phase III ECHO-301/KEYNOTE-252 (NCT02752074) trial of epacadostat with pembrolizumab for melanoma as the combination therapy missed the first primary endpoint of improving progression-free survival vs. pembrolizumab alone. The second primary endpoint of overall survival is not yet determined.

References 

Experimental cancer drugs
Sulfamides
Oxadiazoles
Bromoarenes
Fluoroarenes